George Warburton was the Dean of Wells between 1631 and 1641.

References

Deans of Wells
17th-century English clergy